The Pestalozzi-Gymnasium in Biberach an der Riß, Baden-Württemberg, Germany is a Gymnasium (high school) founded in 1860. In 2005 it comprised 1,250 students and 100 teachers.

The school was founded by Fortunée Niederer, a student of Swiss educationalist Johann Heinrich Pestalozzi, and was originally named the Paritätische private Töchterschule ("Equal participation private daughters' school"). Originally an all-girls school, in 1970 it was renamed "Pestalozzi-Gymnasium" at the same time it became co-educational.

Newcastle United F.C. reserve  goalkeeper Loris Karius attended Pestalozzi-Gymnasium Biberach until his move to England in 2009.

References

Educational institutions established in 1860
Gymnasiums in Germany
Schools in Baden-Württemberg
1860 establishments in Germany